Baron de Grimm or Baron von Grimm may refer to:

Constantin de Grimm (1845–1896), Russian-born artist and caricaturist
Friedrich Melchior, Baron von Grimm (1723–1807), German-born journalist, art critic, and diplomat

See also
Grimm (disambiguation)